Yazlıca is a village in the Siirt District of Siirt Province in Turkey. The village is populated by Kurds of the Erebiyan tribe and had a population of 28 in 2021.

The hamlets of Boztaş and Harmanlı are attached to the village.

References 

Villages in Siirt District
Kurdish settlements in Siirt Province